The Congregados Basilica in Portuguese, Igreja dos Congregados is a Portuguese 18th-century baroque Basilica in Braga, Portugal.

The church, a project from the architect André Soares, is flanked on the top by two bell towers, one of which was finished in the 1960s.

References

Roman Catholic churches in Braga
Basilica churches in Portugal